Tarrant may refer to:

Places

United Kingdom
River Tarrant, a river in Dorset, after which several villages are named:
Tarrant Crawford, Dorset
Tarrant Gunville, Dorset
Tarrant Hinton, Dorset
Tarrant Keyneston, Dorset
Tarrant Launceston, Dorset
Tarrant Monkton, Dorset
Tarrant Rawston, Dorset
Tarrant Rushton, Dorset

United States
Tarrant, Alabama
Tarrant, Wisconsin
Tarrant County, Texas

People
 Ambrose Tarrant (1866–1938), Australian cricketer
 Blair Tarrant (born 1990), New Zealand field hockey player
 Brenton Tarrant (born circa 1990), Australian suspect in Christchurch mosque attacks
 Chris Tarrant (born 1946), British radio broadcaster and television presenter
 Chris Tarrant (footballer) (born 1980), Australian footballer
 Colin Tarrant (1952–2012), British actor
 Dick Tarrant (born 1931), American basketball coach
 Dorothy Tarrant (1885–1973), professor of Greek
 Frank Tarrant (1880–1951), Australian cricketer
 George Tarrant (1838–1870), English cricketer
 George Tarrant Sr. (1838–1904), American politician
 Ingrid Tarrant (born 1954), English television presenter
 Jeffrey Tarrant (1956-2019), American businessman
 John Tarrant (athlete) (1932–1975), English long-distance runner
 Louis Tarrant (1903–?), Australian cricketer
 Margaret Tarrant (1888–1959), English illustrator and children's author
 R. J. Tarrant, American classicist
 Richard Tarrant (politician) (born 1942), American businessman and politician
 Robbie Tarrant (born 1989), Australian footballer
 Shawn Z. Tarrant (born 1965), American politician
 Tom Tarrant (born 1931), Australian footballer
 Walter George Tarrant (1875–1942), English developer and builder
 William Tarrant (?–1872), British Hong Kong civil servant and journalist

Fictional characters 
 Del Tarrant, a character from Blake's 7, played by Steven Pacey

See also
 Tarrant automobile, the first petrol engine motor car built in Australia in 1901